†Archinacellidae is an extinct family of paleozoic molluscs of uncertain position (Gastropoda or Monoplacophora).

Description 
These are cap-shaped fossil shells.

Taxonomy 
The taxonomy of the Gastropoda by Bouchet & Rocroi, 2005 categorizes Archinacellidae in the superfamilia Archinacelloidea within the 
Paleozoic molluscs of uncertain systematic position. This family has no subfamilies.

Genera 
Genera in the family Archinacellidae include:
 Archinacella Ulrich & Scofield, 1897 - type genus of the family Archinacellidae
 Archinacella powersi Ulrich & Scofield, 1897 - type species
 Archinacella instabilis (Billings, 1865)
 Barrandicella Peel & Horný, 1999
 Barrandicellopsis Horný, 2000
 Barrandicellopsis ovata - synonym: Archinacella ovata Barrande in Perner, 1903 - Archinacella ovata var. elevata Barrande in Perner, 1903 - type species, Middle Ordovician from Bohemia
 Barrandicellopsis extenuata - synonym: Orthonychia extenuata Barrande in Perner, 1903 - probably belongs to genus Barrandicellopsis, Middle Ordovician from Bohemia

References

External links 

 images

 
Late Ordovician extinctions
Middle Ordovician first appearances